The information regarding List of rivers in the Los Lagos Region on this page has been compiled from the data supplied by GeoNames. It includes all features named "Rio", "Canal", "Arroyo", "Estero" and those Feature Code is associated with a stream of water. This list contains 755 water streams.

Content
This list contains:
 Name of the stream, in Spanish
 Coordinates are latitude and longitude of the feature in ± decimal degrees, at the mouth of the stream
 Link to a map including the Geonameid (a number which uniquely identifies a Geoname feature)
 Feature code explained in 
 Other names for the same feature, if any
 Basin countries additional to Chile, if any

List
(Bueno River flows in the Los Ríos Region, but some tributaries flows also in the Los Lagos Region. For overview we repeat here the complete Bueno Drainage system, and the simple rivers that cross the regions)
 Rio BuenoRío Bueno3897808STM (Lagos R.)
  Rio CaunahueRío Caunahue3896119STM
  Rio CalcurrupeRío Calcurrupe3897326STM(Rio Calcurrupe, Río Calcurrupe)
  Rio PillanleufuRío Pillanleufu3875985STM
  Rio HueinahueRío Hueinahue3887716STM
  Rio NilahueRío Nilahue3878648STM(Rio Milahue, Rio Nilahue, Río Milahue, Río Nilahue)
  Rio ContrafuerteRío Contrafuerte3893707STM
 Los Venados
  Rio RininahueRío Riñinahue3873157STM
 Rio PilmaiquenRío Pilmaiquén3875964STM (+Los Lagos R.)
 Rio GolgolRío Golgol3888948STM(Gol-gol)(Los Lagos R.)
  Rio RahueRío Rahue3873850STM(Los Lagos R.)
  Estero Pichi Damas3876275STM(Estero Pichi Damas, Rio Damas, Río Damas)(Los Lagos R.)

(All in Los Lagos Region)

 Estero La Poza3884921STM
 Rio ChinchinRío Chinchin3895029STM
 Estero Puquitrahue3874621STM
 Rio MaipueRío Maipué3880976STM
 Estero de la Plata3875664STM
 Rio ToroRío Toro3869544STM
 Estero Pitildeo3875763STM(Estero Pilildeo, Estero Pitildeo)
 Estero La Junta3885543STM
 Estero Collihuinco3894189STM
 Rio MauleRío Maule3880303STM
 Rio PuntiagudoRío Puntiagudo3874702STM
 Estero Huempelen3887692STM
 Rio La PlataRío La Plata3884976STM
 Estero Manga de Millar3880720STM(Estero Manga, Estero Manga de Millar)(CL)
 Rio PueloRío Puelo3840186STM(Rio Puelo, Río Puelo)(CL)
 Rio MansoRío Manso3844969STM(Rio Manso, Río Manso)(CL)
 Estero Seco3871057STM
 Rio BarceloRío Barceló3898771STM
 Rio EnganoRío Engaño3890083STM

  Estero Traillen3869362STM
  Estero Zallel3867585STM
  Estero CorreltueEstero Correltué3893463STM(Estero Coreltue, Estero Correltue, Estero Correltué)
  Rio de San JoseRío de San José3872084STM
  Estero Nalalguaca3879080STM(Estero Nalalguaca, Estero Nalalguaco)
  Estero Minas3879816STM
  Rio CalquincoRío Calquinco3897217STM(Estero Calquinco, Rio Calquinco, Río Calquinco)
  Rio ReiguaicoRío Reiguaico3873533STM
  Estero Niltre3878637STM(Estero Niltre, Estero Nitre)
  Rio NanculRío Ñancul3879045STM
  Rio ConguilRío Conguil3893778STM
  Estero Llamue3883002STM(Estero Llamue, Estero Llamus)
  Rio TranguilRío Tranguil3869326STM
  Rio LlizanRío Llizán3882866STM(Rio Lizan, Rio Llizan, Río Lizán, Río Llizán)
  Rio CuacuaRío Cuacua3893223STM(Rio Cuacua, Rio Cuaeua, Río Cuacua)
  Rio PugnrRío Pugñr3874902STM
  Rio Cruces (Santuario)6459020STM
  Estero Chanchan3895512STM
  Rio Valdivia6459011STMS
  Canal Haverbeck6459007CNLB
  Rio Piedra BlancaRío Piedra Blanca3876130STM
  Estero Minas3879815STM
  Rio Santo DomingoRío Santo Domingo3871312STM
  Rio San JuanRío San Juan3872009STM
  Estero Guape3888391STM
  Rio CatrileufuRío Catrileufu3896140STM
  Estero del Peuco3876393STM
  Estero Hueicolla3887721STM(Rio Hueicolla, Río Hueicolla)(CL)
  Rio LameguapiRío Lameguapi3885358STM
  Estero CarimahuidaEstero Carimáhuida3896657STM
  Estero Las AnimasEstero Las Ánimas3884641STM(Estero Las Animas, Estero Las Ánimas, Rio Las Animas, Río Las Animas)
  Estero Dahue3892762STM
  Estero LaninagualEstero Lañinagual3885227STM
  Rio Los PatosRío Los Patos3881621STM
  Estero Paragua3877220STM
  Rio CalminahuaRío Calminahua3897224STM(Rio Calminahua, Rio Calminahue, Río Calminahua, Río Calminahue)
  Rio Molino de OroRío Molino de Oro3879587STM(Estero Molino de Oro, Rio Molino de Oro, Río Molino de Oro)
  Estero TraiguenEstero Traiguén3869374STM(Estero Traiguen, Estero Traiguén, Rio Chirri, Río Chirri)
  Estero Tregua TraiguenEstero Tregua Traiguén3869250STM
  Rio LlollehueRío Llollehue3882857STM(Rio Llollehue, Rio Llollelhue, Río Llollehue, Río Llollelhue)
  Rio LilcopulliRío Lilcopulli3883234STM
  Rio TrahuilcoRío Trahuilco3869388STM
  Rio ZehuilauquenRío Zehuilauquén3867518STM
  Estero Pocopio3875567STM
  Estero Tromen3869054STM
  Rio San PabloRío San Pablo3871860STM
  Estero Forrahue3889402STM(Estero Farrahue, Estero Forrahue)
  Estero Quihue3874278STM
  Estero Dollinco3892327STM
  Estero Roble3873015STM
  Rio ChirriRío Chirri3894966STM(Rio Chirre, Rio Chirri, Río Chirre, Río Chirri)
  Estero Huillinco3887533STM
  Estero Caracol3896794STM
  Estero TrufunEstero Trufún3869011STM
  Estero Coinco3894373STM
  Estero ChapilcahuinEstero Chapilcahuín3895429STM
  Estero Folilco3889414STM
  Estero Cunamo3892983STM
  Estero Remehue3873491STM
  Estero Forrahue3889401STM(Estero Ferrahue, Estero Forrahue)
  Rio LlesquehueRío Llesquehue3882910STM
  Estero Cuinco3893082STM(Estero Coinco, Estero Cuinco, Estero Cuyinco, Riachuelo de Coyunco)
  Estero Concagua3893898STM
  Rio TranallaquinRío Tranallaquín3869347STM
  Rio DamasRío Damas3892749STM
  Estero Pilauco3876019STM
  Estero Melileufu3880116STM
  Estero Polloico3875506STM
  Estero La OvejeriaEstero La Ovejería3885172STM
  Rio LutunRío Lutún3881149STM
  Estero Cinico3894618STM
  Estero Pichi-Coihueco3876290STM
  Estero Lumaco3881172STM
  Rio MuicolpueRío Muicolpué3879218STM(Riachuello Muicolpue, Riachuello Muicolpué, Rio Muicolpue, Río Muicolpué)
  Estero Tijeral3869855STM
  Rio NegroRío Negro3878780STM(Rio Negro, Rio Negro Hueco, Río Negro, Río Negro Hueco)
  Estero Futa Coihueco3889226STM
  Rio LicanRío Licán3883267STM
  Rio PajaritoRío Pajarito3877710STM
  Rio BonitoRío Bonito3898068STM
  Rio AnticuraRío Anticura3899549STM
  Estero Molino3879600STM
  Estero HuillinEstero Huillín3887543STM
  Rio MoroRío Moro3879325STM
  Rio ChanleufuRío Chanleufú3895456STM
  Estero Gajardo3889206STM
  Estero El Manzano3891074STM(Estero El Manzano, Rio Malalcura, Río Malalcura)
  Estero Pitril3875751STM
  Estero Hueyelhue3887584STM(Estero Hueyelhue, Rio Hueyelhue, Río Hueyelhue)
  Estero Chioca3894994STM
  Rio Pichi-ChonleufuRío Pichi-Chonleufu3876296STM
  Estero Cashicue3896292STM
  Estero SagllueEstero Sagllúe3872649STM(Estero Llagllue, Estero Llagllúe, Estero Sagllue, Estero Sagllúe)
  Estero Pichil3876260STM
  Estero Pescadores3876440STM
  Estero PutraiguenEstero Putraiguén3874555STM
  Estero Pichi-Lag3876259STM
  Rio VerdeRío Verde3868412STM
  Estero Nilque3878638STM
  Estero Huilma3887520STM(Estero Huelma, Estero Huilma)
  Rio ChanchanRío Chanchan3895511STM
  Estero Pichul3876216STM
  Estero Pangua3877380STM
  Estero Carpa3896557STM
  Estero Chahuico3895671STM
  Estero Putame3874565STM
  Los Tres Esteros3881311STM
  Estero Salca3872577STM
  Estero MillantueEstero Millantué3879877STM
  Rio ChifinRío Chifin3895160STM(Estero Chitin, Rio Chifin, Rio Chufin, Río Chifin, Río Chufin)
  Estero Negro3878810STM
  Rio CholguacoRío Cholguaco3895627STM(Rio Chalguaco, Rio Chalhuaco, Río Chalguaco, Río Chalhuaco)(CL)
  Estero HuillinEstero Huillín3887542STM
  Rio ForrahueRío Forrahue3889400STM
  Rio CoihuecoRío Coihueco3894386STM
  Estero del Encanto3890103STM(Estero del Encanta, Estero del Encanto)
  Rio PescaderoRío Pescadero3876454STM(Estero Pescadero, Rio Pescadero, Río Pescadero)
  Rio CoihuecoRío Coihueco3894385STM
  Estero Rafunco3873858STM
  Estero Huillinco3887532STM
  Estero El Encanto3891410STM(Estero Buyinco, Estero El Encanto)
  Estero Llay-Llay3882923STM
  Estero Los Riscos3881402STM
  Rio NegroRío Negro3878779STM
  Estero Ulmuco3868831STM
  Estero Riachuelo3873340STM
  Estero HuillinEstero Huillín3887541STM
  Estero Huanteleufu3887770STM
  Estero Rodriguero3872951STM
  Estero La Cascada3886314STM(Estero La Cascada, Estero de la Cascada)
  Estero Ruful3872715STM
  Estero El Salto3890431STM
  Estero Piedras Altas3876083STM
  Rio MoroRío Moro3879324STM
  Estero Coligual3894268STM
  Estero Huillinco3887531STM
  Estero Lliuco3882874STM
  Estero Calzoncillo3897194STM
  Estero Lindero3883152STM
  Estero Los BanosEstero Los Baños3882366STM(Estero Los Banos, Estero Los Baños, Estero de los Banos, Estero de los Baños)
  Estero Casa Blanca3896408STM
  Rio ColoradoRío Colorado3894026STM
  Rio BlancoRío Blanco3898207STM
  Estero Coique3894345STM
  Estero Venado3868508STM
  Estero Huillinco3887530STM
  Estero Choroico3894856STM
  Estero Nochaco3878584STM
  Rio GaviotasRío Gaviotas3889044STM
  Rio PichicoihuecoRío Pichicoihueco3876289STM
  Estero Pichi Llay-Llay3876251STM
  Estero Agua FriaEstero Agua Fría3900479STM
  Rio Aguas MalasRío Aguas Malas3900409STM
  Rio CallaoRío Callao3897259STM
  Rio BonitoRío Bonito3898067STM
  Estero del Crucero3893264STM(Estero Del Crucero, Estero del Crucero)
  Estero Pescado3876449STM
  Rio LliucoRío Lliuco3882873STM(Estero Guaguan, Rio Lliuco, Río Lliuco)
  Rio NalcasRío Nalcas3879074STM
  Rio BlancoRío Blanco3898206STM
  Estero Futa3889228STM
  Estero PoblacionEstero Población3875598STM
  Rio QuilqueRío Quilque3874089STM
  Rio ConicoRío Coñico3893765STM
  Estero Las Minas3884161STM
  Estero Picaso3876329STM
  Estero La Palizada3885166STM
  Rio San PedroRío San Pedro3871790STM
  Estero del NadiEstero del Ñadi3879115STM
  Estero ManucaEstero Mañuca3880643STM
  Estero Agua Buena3900574STM
  Rio PichicopeRío Pichicope3876284STM
  Rio GuayuscaRío Guayusca3888296STM(Riachuelo Guayusca, Rio Guayusca, Rio Huayusca, Río Guayusca, Río Huayusca)
  Estero Curaco3892918STM
  Estero Piedras3876092STM
  Estero Chingue3895009STM
  Estero Ganso3889137STM
  Rio BlancoRío Blanco3898205STM
  Estero Paso Malo3877082STM
  Estero Pampa Bonita3877483STM
  Estero Coihueco3894387STM
  Rio LopezRío López3882503STM
  Estero Potrerillo de las Yeguas3875322STM
  Estero de los Capados3896854STM
  Estero de la ExpedicionEstero de la Expedición3889657STM
  Rio NihueRío Nihué3878659STM
  Rio BurroRío Burro3897688STM(Estero El Burro, Rio Burro, Río Burro)
  Rio NegroRío Negro3878778STM
  Estero Sin Nombre8047818STM
  Estero Puma3874850STM
  Estero Cancha Rayada3896996STM
  Rio MauleRío Maule3880304STM
  Estero La Poza3884920STM
  Estero La Huella3885634STM
  Estero del Medio8047623STM
  Estero El Pescado3876448STM(Estero El Pescado, Estero Pescado)
  Estero La Guacha3885637STM(Estero La Guacha, Estero La Huacha)
  Estero de la Laguna3885787STM
  Estero Burro Chico3897687STM
  Rio Blanco ArenalRío Blanco Arenal3898204STM(Rio Blanco, Rio Blanco Arenal, Río Blanco, Río Blanco Arenal)
  Rio PeullaRío Peulla3876386STM
  Estero Pilildeo3875997STM
  Estero El ZanjonEstero El Zanjón3890156STM
  Rio NegroRío Negro3878777STM
  Estero La Piedra3885017STM
  Rio CanalRío Cañal3897038STM
  Estero HuillinEstero Huillín8047817STM
  Rio San LuisRío San Luis3871940STM
  Rio TechadoRío Techado3870056STM
  Estero La Arena3886534STM
  Estero La Vega3883570STM
  Estero Las Marias8047816STM
  Estero Lopez ChicoEstero López Chico3882502STM
  Estero Planchado8047622STM
  Rio Blanco Las CascadasRío Blanco Las Cascadas8052899STM
  Estero Loma de Piedra3882625STM(Estero Loma de Piedra, Estero Lomo de la Piedra)
  Estero Centinela3895965STM
  Estero Napaco3879026STM
  Estero La PoblacionEstero La Población3884957STM
  Estero Esperanza3889838STM(Estero Esperanza, Rio Esperanza, Río Esperanza)
  Estero La Cascada3886313STM(Estero La Cascada, Estero la Cascada)(CL)
  Estero del JardinEstero del Jardín3886953STM
  Estero La Guacha3885815STM
  Estero Los Pellines3881606STM
  Estero La Ballena3886521STM(Estero Ballena, Estero La Ballena)
  Estero Polizones3875516STM
  Rio BlancoRío Blanco3898202STM
  Estero Robles3873003STM
  Estero Mirales3879713STM
  Estero Alvarado3899863STM
  Estero Agua FriaEstero Agua Fría3900478STM
  Rio CochinoRío Cochino3894493STM(Rio Cocaino, Rio Cochino, Río Cocaino, Río Cochino)(CL)
  Estero de la CompaniaEstero de la Compañía3893948STM
  Estero La Cofiana8047621STM
  Rio ParioRío Pario3877165STM
  Rio HuayuscaRío Huayusca3887746STM(Rio Guayusca, Rio Huayusca, Rio Hueyusca, Río Guayusca, Río Huayusca, Río Hueyusca)
  Rio MaitenRío Maitén3880958STM
  Rio San JuanRío San Juan3872008STM
  Estero Kuschel3886588STM(Estero Kuschel, Estero Kuschet)
  Estero Chaquihue3895400STM
  Rio PatoRío Pato3876991STM
  Rio de Las CaullesRío de Las Caulles3884497STM(Rio de Las Caulles, Rio de las Caulles, Río de Las Caulles, Río de las Caulles)
  Estero El Molino3890978STM
  Estero PiuchenEstero Piuchén3875740STM
  Rio del NorteRío del Norte3878508STM
  Rio TepualRío Tepual3869966STM
  Rio PequenoRío Pequeño3876588STM
  Rio JulietRío Juliet3886738STM
  Rio FrioRío Frío3889286STM
  Rio PargaRío Parga3877176STM
  Estero Pozo de Oro3875230STM
  Rio TepuRío Tepú8047813STM(Rio Tepu, Rio de la Nutria, Río Tepú, Río de la Nutria)
  Estero Piedra3876149STM
  Estero El Salto3872506STM(Estero El Salto, Estero del Salto)
  Rio BlancoRío Blanco3898203STM
  Estero Cuervo8047814STM
  Rio ColoradoRío Colorado3894025STM(Rio Colorado, Rio Nutria, Río Colorado, Río Nutria)(CL)
  Rio BarilocheRío Bariloche3898755STM
  Rio La EsperanzaRío La Esperanza3885995STM(Rio La Esperanza, Rio de la Esperanza, Río La Esperanza, Río de la Esperanza)
  Rio del SaltoRío del Salto3872501STM
  Estero Copihue8047815STM
  Estero QuillinEstero Quillín3874126STM
  Rio AmancayRío Amancay3899843STM
  Estero Sin Nombre8048578STM
  Rio BlancoRío Blanco3898201STM
  Rio Huenu-HuenuRío Hueñu-Hueñu3887639STM(Rio Hueno Hueno, Rio Huenu-Huenu, Río Hueño Hueño, Río Hueñu-Hueñu)
  Rio La ApancoraRío La Apancora8048585STM
  Rio PlataRío Plata8048584STM
  Rio de los PatosRío de los Patos3876980STM
  Estero Pichilaguna8047997STM
  Rio La CimbraRío La Cimbra3886244STM(Rio La Cimbra, Rio la Cimbra, Río La Cimbra, Río la Cimbra)
  Rio FrioRío Frío3889285STM(Estero Las Minas, Rio Frio, Río Frío)
  Rio CachimbaRío Cachimba3897514STM
  Rio Sin NombreRío Sin Nombre8048587STM
  Rio SurRío Sur3876445STM(Rio Pescado del Sur, Rio Sur, Río Pescado del Sur, Río Sur)
  Rio ConchaRío Concha3893884STM(Rio Concha, Rio Huenohueno, Río Concha, Río Huenohueno)
  Estero Puentes3875014STM
  Rio de La PozaRío de La Poza3884916STM
  Rio CamahuetoRío Camahueto3897192STM(Rio Camahueto, Rio Tempe, Río Camahueto, Río Tempe)
  Rio LlicoRío Llico3882893STM
  Estero Torres3869499STM
  Rio NadiRío Ñadi3879114STM(Rio Nade, Rio Nadi, Río Ñade, Río Ñadi)
  Estero Esperanza3889837STM
  Rio QuitacalzonesRío Quitacalzones3873915STM
  Estero del Molino3879595STM
  Rio ToroRío Toro3869543STM
  Rio PupitrenRío Pupitrén3874670STM
  Rio ChaquiguanRío Chaquiguan3895401STM
  Estero de los Colhuines3894285STM
  Rio CalienteRío Caliente3897271STM
  Rio Cuesta AltaRío Cuesta Alta8048588STM
  Estero Casitas3896282STM(Estero Casita, Estero Casitas)
  Estero Largo8047996STM
  Rio Las MarcasRío Las Marcas8048589STM
  Rio ReloncaviRío Reloncaví3873505STM
  Estero Coipo3894362STM
  Estero Los Arcos3882412STM
  Rio PutratrauRío Putratrau3874553STM
  Estero Lamedi3885361STM
  Rio Sin NombreRío Sin Nombre3870831STM
  Rio ColegualRío Colegual3894289STM(Rio Colegual, Rio Coligual, Río Colegual)
  Rio VenadoRío Venado8048493STM
  Rio ChepaRío Chepa3895265STM
  Rio Los PatosRío Los Patos8048494STM
  Rio de la PalomaRío de la Paloma3877559STM
  Rio BotellaRío Botella8048579STM
  Rio AmarilloRío Amarillo3899799STM
  Estero Agua Buena3900573STM
  Rio PetrohueRío Petrohué3876409STM(Rio Petrohue, Río Petrohué)
  Estero Molino3879599STM
  Rio CalabozoRío Calabozo3897360STM
  Rio del EsteRío del Este3889729STM
  Estero Pisagua8047994STM
  Rio CordilleraRío Cordillera3893579STM
  Estero ManioEstero Mañío3880698STM
  Estero ArrayanEstero Arrayán3899306STM(Estero Arrayan, Estero Arrayán, Rio Arrayan, Río Arrayan)
  Estero El ManioEstero El Mañío3880699STM(Estero El Manio, Estero El Mañío, Estero Manio, Estero Mañío)
  Rio NegroRío Negro3878776STM
  Rio de los OyarzosRío de los Oyarzos3877887STM(Rio Oyarzo, Rio de los Oyarzos, Río Oyarzo, Río de los Oyarzos)
  Rio BernardinaRío Bernardina3898418STM
  Rio PatoRío Pato8048497STM
  Rio CorrentosoRío Correntoso8048496STM
  Estero Lobos3882781STM(Estero Lobos, Rio Arenas, Rio Lobo, Río Arenas, Río Lobo)
  Estero Valverde3868618STM
  Rio TraidorRío Traidor3869387STM
  Rio El ArcoRío El Arco3891958STM
  Rio PichiblancoRío Pichiblanco8048582STM
  Rio CoihueRío Coihue8048576STM
  Estero La Junta3885542STM(Estero La Junta, Rio La Junta, Río La Junta)
  Rio La PenaRío La Peña8048489STM
  Estero El Rosario8047995STM
  Rio CanonesRío Cañones3896894STM
  Rio Sin NombreRío Sin Nombre8048488STM
  Rio CajonmoRío Cajonmó3897378STM
  Rio NegroRío Negro3878775STM
  Rio EsteRío Este3889730STM
  Rio ColoradoRío Colorado8048583STM
  Estero ChavezEstero Chávez8048498STM
  Estero El TrapenEstero El Trapén3890226STM
  Estero El Roble8047993STM
  Rio BlancoRío Blanco3898200STM
  Estero La Tranca3883677STM
  Rio ChicoRío Chico3895177STM
  Estero Boecho3898143STM
  Rio OrocoRío Oroco8048492STM
  Estero AntamoEstero Antamó8048591STM
  Rio FrioRío Frío8048581STM
  Estero San Antonio8048590STM
  Rio Playa BlancaRío Playa Blanca8048486STM
  Rio OscuroRío Oscuro3877956STM
  Rio ChicoRío Chico3895176STM
  Rio RollizoRío Rollizo3872917STM
  Estero Arena3899409STM
  Rio NegroRío Negro3878774STM
  Rio ChicoRío Chico3895175STM
  Rio CululirRío Cululir3893012STM(Rio Cuculin, Rio Cululin, Rio Cululir, Río Cuculin, Río Cululir)
  Rio El GatoRío El Gato3889064STM(Rio El Gato, Rio Gato, Río El Gato, Río Gato)
  Rio CorrentosoRío Correntoso3893460STM
  Rio ChaqueiguaRío Chaqueigua3895404STM(Rio Chaqueigua, Rio Chaqueihua, Río Chaqueigua, Río Chaqueihua)
  Estero Colorado3894051STM
  Rio CoihuinRío Coihuín3894382STM
  Rio La CulebraRío La Culebra8047992STM
  Rio ColoradoRío Colorado3894024STM(Estero Colorado, Rio Colorado, Río Colorado)
  Estero Pichipilluco8048499STM
  Rio ChinchiguapiRío Chinchiguapi3895037STM(Estero Chinchiguapi, Rio Chinchiguapi, Río Chinchiguapi)
  Rio PangalRío Pangal3877394STM(Estero Pangal, Rio Pangal, Río Pangal)
  Rio Oscuro del SaltoRío Oscuro del Salto3877953STM(Rio Oscuro, Rio Oscuro del Salto, Río Oscuro, Río Oscuro del Salto)
  Rio TengloRío Tenglo3869991STM
  Rio CarcamoRío Cárcamo3896747STM
  Rio de La ZorraRío de La Zorra3867492STM(Estero de la Zorra, Rio de La Zorra, Río de La Zorra)
  Estero Pilluco3875975STM
  Estero Negro8048491STM
  Rio QuenuirRío Quenuir3874370STM
  Estero Molino3879598STM
  Rio del EsteRío del Este3889728STM
  Rio ToledoRío Toledo3869685STM
  Rio CoihuinRío Coihuín3895587STM(Rio Chamiza, Rio Coihuin, Río Chamiza, Río Coihuín)
  Rio PalihueRío Palihue3877622STM
  Rio CochamoRío Cochamó3894501STM(Rio Cochamo, Rio Concha, Río Cochamó, Río Concha)
  Rio OstionesRío Ostiones3877938STM
  Rio GomezRío Gómez3888929STM
  Rio LeonesRío Leones3883333STM
  Rio ChellesRío Chelles3895274STM
  Rio TaylorRío Taylor8048516STM(Rio Taylor, Río Taylor)
  Rio GuarneRío Guarne3888349STM
  Rio BlancoRío Blanco3898199STM
  Rio TempanosRío Témpanos8047933STM
  Arroyo Quemado3874402STM
  Estero MisquihueEstero Misquihué3879680STM
  Rio BarrancoRío Barranco3898711STM
  Rio ChinquiuRío Chinquiu3894998STM(Rio Chincui, Rio Chinquiu, Río Chincui, Río Chinquiu)(CL)
  Rio de PiedraRío de Piedra8048519STM(Rio de Piedra, Río de Piedra)
  Estero Tranca3869341STM
  Rio MorrosRío Morros3879286STM
  Rio CorrentosoRío Correntoso3893459STM(Arroyo Correntoso, Rio Correntoso, Río Correntoso)(CL)
  Rio CululilRío Cululil3893014STM
  Estero Montriel8047868STM
  Estero Chillcon3895078STM
  Rio ParedesRío Paredes3877190STM
  Estero Guada8048520STM(Estero Guada)
  Rio TamborRío Tambor3870189STM
  Estero TenioEstero Teñio3869982STM
  Rio OlmopulliRío Olmopulli3878076STM
  Rio AvellanoRío Avellano3899099STM
  Rio CebadalRío Cebadal3896046STM
  Estero Metri3895665STM(Estero Chaicamo, Estero Chaícamo, Estero Metri, Rio Chaicamo, Río Chaicamó)(CL)
  Rio TrapenRío Trapén3890225STM(Estero El Trapen, Estero El Trapén, Rio Trapen, Río Trapén)(CL)
  Rio PuelpunRío Puelpun3875028STM
  Estero Chaula8047870ESTY
  Rio ChaicaRío Chaica3895666STM(Rio Chaica, Rio Chaula, Rio Chauta, Río Chaica, Río Chaula, Río Chauta)
  Rio MaullinRío Maullín3880300STM
  Rio del PenolRío del Peñol3876635STM
  Rio ApreturaRío Apretura3899483STM
  Rio CariquildaRío Cariquilda3896654STM
  Rio de La MaquinaRío de La Máquina3885391STM(Rio de La Maquina, Rio de la Maquina, Río de La Máquina, Río de la Máquina)
  Rio LencaRío Lenca3883401STM
  Rio AstilRío Astil3899211STM
  Rio El VadoRío El Vado3890198STM
  Rio del ReyRío del Rey3873353STM
  Rio ChilcaRío Chilca3895133STM
  Rio Puelo ChicoRío Puelo Chico3875030STM
  Rio San Pedro NolascoRío San Pedro Nolasco3871773ESTY
  Estero Cholhue8047827ESTY
  Rio HuelmoRío Huelmo8048593STM
  Rio PoiguenRío Poiguén3875549STM
  Rio OlleroRío Ollero3878080STM(Rio Corhuio, Rio Ollero, Río Corhuio, Río Ollero)(CL)
  Rio GalponesRío Galpones3889154STM
  Rio SteffenRío Steffen3870566STM
  Estero QuetrulauquenEstero Quetrulauquén8047828ESTY
  Rio BlancoRío Blanco3898198STM
  Arroyo PuquitrinArroyo Puquitrín3874620STM
  Estero Chencoihue8047826ESTY
  Estero Matanzas3880351STM(Estero Matanzas, Rio Matanzas, Río Matanzas)
  Rio de las CumbresRío de las Cumbres3893002STM
  Rio CurahueRío Curahué3892910STM(Arroyo Curahue, Rio Curahue, Río Curahué)(CL)
  Rio ChilcoRío Chilco3895125STM(Rio Chilco, Rio Chileo, Río Chilco, Río Chileo)
  Estero Rulo3872703STM(Estero Rulo, Rio Rulo, Río Rulo)(CL)
  Rio FrioRío Frío3889284STM
  Rio ChucahueRío Chucahue8047823STM
  Estero del Molino3879590ESTY(Estero Huito, Estero del Molino, Molino, Rio del Molino, Río del Molino)(CL)
  Estero CuitueEstero Cuitúe8047859STM
  Rio San JoseRío San José3872087STM
  Rio LlaguepeRío Llaguepe3883045STM(Rio Llaguepe, Rio Llahuape, Rio Llahuepe, Río Llaguepe, Río Llahuape, Río Llahuepe)
  Rio de La MaquinaRío de La Máquina3880574STM(Rio Maquina, Rio de La Maquina, Río Máquina, Río de La Máquina)(CL)
  Rio MazazoRío Mazazo3880262STM(Rio Mazaso, Rio Mazazo, Río Mazaso, Río Mazazo)
  Estero Yale8048522STM(Estero Yale)
  Rio ChaparanoRío Chaparano3895440STM
  Estero Putun8048487STM
  Estero Aullar8048559STM
  Rio PuelcheRío Puelche3875036STM
  Rio El DaoRío El Dao3891509STM
  Rio AstilleroRío Astillero3899205STM
  Rio ManihueicoRío Manihueico3880705STM
  Estero Quinched8049582ESTY(Estero Quinched)
  Rio LenquiRío Lenqui3883388STM
  Estero Molin8049583STM(Estero Molin)
  Estero CollihueEstero Collihué3894191STM(Estero Collihue, Estero Collihué,Estero de Codihue, Estero de Codihué)
  Rio AuchaRío Aucha3899155STM(Rio Aucha, Rio Aucho, Río Aucha)
  Estero San Antonio8048599STM
  Rio AhincoRío Ahinco3900357STM(Rio Ahinco, Rio Llanco, Río Ahinco, Río Llanco)
  Estero Tenco8048598STM
  Rio TraidorRío Traidor3869386STM
  Rio La MangaRío La Manga8047911STM(Rio La Manga, Río La Manga)
  Estero La DivisionEstero La División3886090STM
  Rio MaquinaRío Máquina3880573STM
  Rio ContaoRío Contao3893717STM
  Estero CaicaenEstero Caicaén8049279STM(Estero Caicaen, Estero Caicaén)
  Estero Alvarado8048607STM
  Estero Los Cristales3882114STM
  Rio ChicoRío Chico3895174STM
  Estero Chucagua8048638STM
  Rio ZamboRío Zambo8047908STM
  Rio PuninRío Puñin8047909STM
  Estero Sin Nombre8048745STM
  Rio PollolloRío Pollollo3875505STM
  Estero Chauquiar8538084STM
  Rio GuyundenRío Guyunden3888228STM
  Estero Chagual3895681STM(Estero Chagual, Rio Chagual, Rio Chaque, Río Chagual, Río Chaque)
  Rio NegroRío Negro3878773STM
  Rio del AlerceRío del Alerce3900189STM
  Estero NicoEstero Ñico8048004STM(Estero Nico, Estero Ñico)
  Estero La Poza8594194STM
  Estero Huicha3887574STM(Estero Huicha, Rio Huicha)
  Estero Quildaco3874231STM
  Canal AulenCanal Aulén8048011CHN
  Rio ManaoRío Manao3880748STM
  Estero Mui8048010STM
  Rio QuitoRío Quito3873907STM
  Estero del Ded8048748ESTY(Estero del Ded)(CL)
  Estero HueihueEstero Hueihué3887718STM
  Rio PudetoRío Pudeto3875058ESTY
  Rio DesaguaderoRío Desaguadero3892641STM
  Rio PudelleRío Pudelle3875060STM
  Rio HuillincoRío Huillinco3887526STM
  Rio LlancoRío Llanco3969599STM
  Rio MechaicoRío Mechaico3880249STM
  Rio QuetenRío Quetén8048037STM
  Rio NegroRío Negro3969707STM
  Rio San AntonioRío San Antonio3969851STM
  Rio MayamoRío Mayamo3880283STM
  Rio CoquiaoRío Coquiao3969853STM
  Rio BlancoRío Blanco3969706STM
  Rio NegroRío Negro3878769STM
  Rio NegroRío Negro3878771STM
  Rio VilcunRío Vilcún3868204STM
  Rio BlancoRío Blanco3898197STM
  Rio MetrequenRío Metrequen3879958STM(Rio Metrenque, Rio Metrenquen, Rio Metrequen, Río Metrenque, Río Metrenquen, Río Metrequen)
  Rio ChauchilRío Chauchil3969641STM
  Estero El Varal8048002STM(Estero El Varal)
  Arroyo Ventisquero3868474STM
  Rio QuecheRío Queche8047917STM(Rio Queche, Río Queche)
  Arroyo Ventisquero3868468STM
  Rio CalonjeRío Calonje3897222STM
  Rio CheniuRío Cheñiu8047901STM(Rio Cheniu, Río Cheñiu)
  Rio CisnesRío Cisnes3949880STM
  Estero Pichicolo3876286STM(Estero Pichicolo, Estero Pichicolu)
  Arroyo El Salto3969810STM
  Rio VilcunRío Vilcún3868203STM(Rio Luileu, Rio Vilcun, Río Vilcún)
  Rio El ToroRío El Toro3969809STM
  Estero El Nueve3969595STM
  Rio ChepuRío Chepu3895248STM
  Rio PueloRío Puelo3969812STM
  Rio PuntraRío Puntra3874681STM
  Rio GrandeRío Grande3888775STM
  Rio CholgoRío Cholgo3969710STM
  Estero Aucho3899148STM(Estero Aucho, Rio Aucho, Río Aucho)
  Rio PailaRío Paila3969591STM
  Arroyo Correntoso3969815STM
  Rio TantaucoRío Tantauco3870160STM
  Rio ButalcuraRío Butalcura3897666STM
  Rio UniversoRío Universo3969808STM
  Rio RaquelitaRío Raquelita3969806STM
  Rio ColucoRío Coluco3893989STM
  Rio TongoiRío Tongoi3869634STM(Rio Tongoi, Rio Tongoy, Río Tongoi, Río Tongoy)
  Arroyo Barrancas3898733STM
  Rio LarRío Lar3884838STM
  Rio RefugioRío Refugio3873551STM
  Rio MirtaRío Mirta3969805STM
  Rio BatalcuraRío Batalcura3969847STM
  Rio MarilmoRío Marilmó3969697STM
  Rio MetalquiRío Metalqui3879969STM
  Rio CarinueicoRío Carinueico3969588STM
  Rio PudidiRío Pudidi3969911STM
  Rio ColuRío Colú3893991STM(Estero Colu, Estero Colú, Rio Colu, Río Colú)
  Rio HuequiRío Huequi3887620STM(Hueguetumao, Huehuetumao, Rio Hueguetamao, Rio Hueque, Rio Huequi, Río Huequi)
  Rio TeleleRío Telele3969695STM
  Rio QuillaicoRío Quillaico3874177STM
  Rio EscondidoRío Escondido3889923STM
  Rio TocoihueRío Tocoihué3969612STM
  Rio de la PlataRío de la Plata3875661STM
  Rio CuriRío Curi3892877STM
  Rio AbtaoRío Abtao3900728STM
  Estero San Juan3872022STM
  Rio AyacaraRío Ayacara3899082STM
  Rio HuinalRío Huinal3969714STM
  Rio LloncochaiguaRío Lloncochaigua3882844STM(Lloncochagua, Loncochaigue, Loncochaigüe, Quebrada de Lloncochallan, Rio Lloncochaigua, Rio Lloncochaigue, Rio Loncochallhua, Río Lloncochaigua, Río Lloncochaigüe, Río Loncochallhua)
  Rio PuchabranRío Puchabrán3969909STM
  Rio NangoRío Ñango3879042STM
  Rio BuillRío Buill3897775STM(Rio Buill, Rio Huell, Río Buill)
  Rio PorcelanaRío Porcelana3969717STM
  Rio LacayaRío Lacaya3969802STM
  Rio BarceloRío Barceló3969800STM
  Rio LibertadorRío Libertador3969803STM
  Rio VillatasmoRío Villatasmo3868150STM
  Rio AnayRío Anay3899742STM(Rio Ahui, Rio Amay, Rio Anai, Rio Anay, Río Ahui, Río Anay)
  Rio TroliguanRío Troliguán3969719STM
  Rio GamboaRío Gamboa3889142STM
  Rio ReremoRío Reremo3873410STM
  Rio VodudahueRío Vodudahué3867992STM(Rio Bodudahue, Rio Vodudahue, Rio de la Laja, Río Bodudahue, Río Vodudahué)
  Rio Chico NuevoRío Chico Nuevo3969690STM
  Rio EscalaRío Escala3969798STM
  Rio Cole-ColeRío Cole-Cole3894294STM
  Rio NegroRío Negro3949879STM
  Estero Llicaldad3882903STM
  Rio ChicoRío Chico3969797STM
  Rio ChecoRío Checo3895308STM(Rio Checo, Rio Denal, Río Checo, Río Deñal)
  Rio HondoRío Hondo3969643STM
  Estero Rauco3873666STM
  Rio GonzaloRío Gonzalo3969688STM
  Rio AquellasRío Aquellas3899481STM
  Rio RenihueRío Reñihué3969724STM
  Rio ToroRío Toro3869542STM
  Rio NegroRío Negro3969723STM
  Rio DongoRío Dongo3969582STM
  Rio CipresalRío Cipresal3969898STM
  Rio LlinRío Llin3969908STM
  Rio HuenueRío Huenue3969907STM
  Rio CollilRío Collil3969580STM
  Rio PuchanquinRío Puchanquin3875091STM
  Rio AlcaldeoRío Alcaldeo3900254STM(Alcadeo, Riachuelo Ancalevo, Rio Alcaldeo, Rio Alcaldes, Río Alcaldeo)
  Rio PalpahuenRío Palpahuén3877521STM
  Rio PuritauquenRío Puritauquén3969648STM(Rio Puritauquen, Rio Quitacalzon, Río Puritauquén, Río Quitacalzon)(CL)
  Rio QuilqueRío Quilque3874088STM
  Rio BlancoRío Blanco3969725STM
  Estero Detif3969874STM
  Rio ContentoRío Contento3893714STM
  Rio PanolRío Pañol3877323STM
  Rio NotueRío Notué3878480STM(Rio Natue, Rio Natué, Rio Notue, Río Notué)
  Rio TranilRío Trañil3869324STM
  Rio MayulRío Mayul3880265STM
  Rio TalcanRío Talcan3870273STM
  Rio CauyahueRío Cauyahué3896089STM
  Rio CipresesRío Cipreses3894613STM(Rio Cipreces, Rio Cipreses, Río Cipreces, Río Cipreses)
  Rio PurilauquenRío Purilauquén3874596STM(Boca de Peirilauguen, Rio Purilauquen, Río Purilauquén)
  Rio CanalhueRío Cañalhué3897028STM
  Rio NegroRío Negro3878767STM
  Rio BravoRío Bravo3897947STM
  Rio CuyuldeoRío Cuyuldeo3892788STM
  Rio MelilebuRío Melilebú3880117STM
  Rio TorrentesRío Torrentes3869509STM
  Rio PulpitoRío Púlpito3969904STM
  Rio NegroRío Negro3878770STM
  Rio PumolRío Pumol3874836STM
  Rio RayasRío Rayas3873648STM(Rio Blanco, Rio Rayas, Río Blanco, Río Rayas)
  Rio MercedesRío Mercedes3880027STM
  Rio LibnoRío Libno3883278STM(Riachuelo Libno, Rio Libno, Río Libno)(CL)
  Rio RayasRío Rayas3969684STM
  Rio CamahuetoRío Camahueto3969682STM(Rio Camahueto, Rio Vilcun, Río Camahueto, Río Vilcún)
  Estero LebicanEstero Lebicán3883458STM
  Rio RenihueRío Reñihué3873432STM
  Rio CompuRío Compu3893941STM
  Rio MaihuecoRío Maihueco3881003STM
  Rio NatriRío Natri3969870STM
  Rio MolulcoRío Molulco3969902STM
  Rio CatiaoRío Catiao3896157STM
  Rio MolluecoRío Mollueco3879548STM
  Rio SurRío Sur3969573STM
  Rio MechaiRío Mechai3880251STM(Estero Mechai, Rio Mechai, Rio Mechay, Río Mechai, Río Mechay)
  Rio MichinmahuidaRío Michinmahuida3969793STM
  Arroyo Compu3893943STM
  Rio Los MallinesRío Los Mallines3969728STM
  Rio TablarucaRío Tablaruca3870383STM
  Rio Chaiten o Rio BlancoRío Chaitén o Rio Blanco3895639STM
  Rio NegroRío Negro3969679STM
  Rio ChadmoRío Chadmo3895693STM
  Rio YelchoRío Yelcho3867697STM(Rio Diamante, Rio Yelcho, Río Yelcho)
  Rio FutaleufuRío Futaleufú3855297STM(Rio Fetaleufu, Rio Futalelfu, Rio Futaleufu, Río Fetaleufú, Río Futalelfú, Río Futaleufú)(CL)
  Rio CorrentosoRío Correntoso3950408STM
  Rio MedinaRío Medina3880221STM
  Rio San AntonioRío San Antonio3969865STM
  Rio HuenocoihueRío Huenocoihue3887653STM
  Rio Natri PangalRío Natri Pangal3969892STM
  Rio AmarilloRío Amarillo3899798STM
  Rio AlerceRío Alerce3969677STM
  Rio PalvitadRío Palvitad3877496STM(Rio Palbitad, Rio Palvitad, Río Palbitad, Río Palvitad)
  Rio MiradorRío Mirador3879737STM
  Rio YaldadRío Yaldad3867763STM
  Rio MinchinmavidaRío Minchinmávida3879798STM(Rio Michimahuida, Rio Minchinmavida, Río Michimahuida, Río Minchinmávida)
  Rio EspolonRío Espolón3969792STM
  Rio BlancoRío Blanco3969790STM
  Rio ChaiguataRío Chaiguata3895656STM(Rio Chaiguala, Rio Chaiguata, Río Chaiguala, Río Chaiguata)
  Rio CenizasRío Cenizas3969788STM
  Rio de la ZorraRío de la Zorra3867487STM(Rio de La Zorra, Rio de la Zorra, Río de La Zorra, Río de la Zorra)
  Rio TigreRío Tigre3969787STM
  Rio AlealebuRío Alealebu3900209STM
  Rio FrioRío Frío3889283STM
  Arroyo Bellavista3969818STM
  Rio del NoresteRío del Noreste3878543STM
  Rio ChicoRío Chico3969821STM
  Rio JoplaRío Jopla3886872STM
  Rio EspolonRío Espolón7116110STM
  Rio PabellonRío Pabellón3877865STM
  Rio WaagRío Waag3867954STM
  Arroyo Quila Seca3874234STM
  Rio Yelcho ChicoRío Yelcho Chico3867695STM
  Rio CorrentosoRío Correntoso3969786STM
  Rio CorcovadoRío Corcovado3893588STM(Rio Colorado, Rio Corcovado, Rio Corobado, Río Colorado, Río Corcovado)
  Estero Guamblad3888508STM(Estero Guambiad, Estero Guamblad, Rio Huamblad)
  Rio de La MinaRío de La Mina3969652STM
  Rio NegroRío Negro3878768STM
  Rio AzuladoRío Azulado3899026STM
  Rio AzulRío Azul3969785STM
  Rio Gil de LemosRío Gil de Lemos3949985STM
  Rio QuilanRío Quilán3874248STM
  Rio CaneloRío Canelo3896932STM(Rio Canelo, Rio Canelos, Río Canelo)
  Rio QuilanlarRío Quilanlar3969568STM
  Arroyo Blanco3969824STM
  Estero Cascada3896311STM
  Rio QuilantarRío Quilantar3874243STM(Rio Quilanlar, Rio Quilantar, Río Quilanlar, Río Quilantar)
  Rio TurbioRío Turbio3868884STM
  Rio RoblesRío Robles3969654STM
  Rio InioRío Inio3887175STM
  Rio AsasaoRío Asasao3899253STM
  Rio SucioRío Sucio3870504STM
  Rio del NorteRío del Norte3878507STM
  Rio NevadoRío Nevado3878709STM
  Rio AyentemaRío Ayentema3899074STM
  Estero Julepe3969783STM
  Rio VerdeRío Verde3868411STM
  Rio CanevRío Canev3896954STM(Rio Canef, Rio Canev, Río Canef, Río Canev)
  Rio SaltoRío Salto3872502STM
  Rio SecoRío Seco3969676STM
  Rio MenorRío Menor3880049STM
  Rio MalitoRío Malito3880855STM(Rio Malito, Rio Melita, Río Malito, Río Melita)
  Arroyo Enredaderas3890072STM(Arroyo Enredadera, Arroyo Enredaderas, Estero Enredadera, Estero Enredaderas)
  Rio El AzulRío El Azul3891923STM(Rio Azul, Rio El Azul, Río Azul, Río El Azul)
  Rio SilamapuRío Silamapu3870889STM
  Rio YeliRío Yeli3867692STM
  Rio MiragualaiRío Miragualai3879717STM(Mirahualai, Rio Maragualay, Rio Miragualai, Rio Miragualay, Río Maragualay, Río Miragualai, Río Miragualay)
  Rio del DiabloRío del Diablo3969773STM
  Estero El Mancay3969740STM
  Rio LoroRío Loro3969674STM
  Estero El Blanco3969741STM
  Río Palena7116117STM (Aysén R.)
  Rio FrioRío Frío3969738STM
  Estero Campana3969675STM
  Rio del TrebolRío del Trebol3969672STM
  Rio TictocRío Tictoc3869882STM
  Estero El Moro3969834STM
  Arroyo LopezArroyo López3882512STM
  Rio OesteRío Oeste3969744STM
  Arroyo Mallines3880829STM
  Estero Cordon BlancoEstero Cordón Blanco3969772STM
  Rio del TorrenteRío del Torrente3869511STM
  Rio TranquiloRío Tranquilo3869308STM
  Rio El SaltoRío El Salto3969836STM(Rio El Tigre, Río El Tigre)(CL)
  Arroyo Las Matreras3884196STM
  Arroyo EL Moro3969837STM
  Rio SilberiaRío Silberia3969843STM
  Rio FrutillaRío Frutilla3950155STM

See also
 List of lakes in Chile
 List of volcanoes in Chile
 List of islands of Chile
 List of fjords, channels, sounds and straits of Chile
 List of lighthouses in Chile

Notes

References

External links
 Rivers of Chile
 Base de Datos Hidrográfica de Chile
 

Lists of rivers of Chile by region